This is a list of nicknames of prime ministers of Australia.

List of nicknames

Edmund Barton 
Full name: Edmund Barton
Toby Tosspot

Alfred Deakin 
Full name: Alfred Deakin
Affable Alfred

Chris Watson 
Full name: John Christian Watson

George Reid 
Full name: George Houston Reid
Yes-No Reid in reference a long speech where he was unwilling to take a clear position on federation.

Andrew Fisher 
Full name:Andrew Fisher

Joseph Cook 
Full name: Joseph Cook

Billy Hughes 
Full name: William Morris Hughes
The Little Digger
The Rat Due to his support for conscription & defection from the Labor Party to the Liberal Party

Stanley Bruce 
Full name: Stanley Melbourne Bruce, 1st Viscount Bruce of Melbourne

James Scullin 
Full name: James Henry Scullin

Joseph Lyons 
Full name: Joseph Aloysius Lyons
Honest Joe

Earle Page 
Full name: Earle Christmas Grafton Page

Robert Menzies 
Full name: Robert Gordon Menzies
Ming the Merciless
Pig iron Bob

Arthur Fadden 
Full name: Arthur William Fadden
Artie

John Curtin 
Full name: John Joseph Ambrose Curtin
Bumble

Frank Forde 
Full name: Francis Michael Forde

Ben Chifley 
Full name: Joseph Benedict Chifley

Harold Holt 
Full name: Harold Edward Holt

John McEwen 
Full name: John McEwen
Black Jack

John Gorton 
Full name: John Grey Gorton
Jolly John

William McMahon 
Full name: William McMahon
Billy the Leak
Billy Liar
Billy Big Ears

Gough Whitlam 
Full name: Edward Gough Whitlam
The Young Brolga
Goughie

Malcolm Fraser 
Full name: John Malcolm Fraser

 The Prefect

Bob Hawke 
Full name: Robert James Lee Hawke
The Silver BodgieLittle Caesar Paul Keating 
Full name: Paul John Keating

 The Mortician The Lizard of Oz John Howard 
Full name: John Winston HowardHonest JohnLittle Johnnie Howard Kevin Rudd 
Full name: Kevin Michael RuddKevin07 his campaign slogan for the 2007 electionMilky Bar Kid in his likeness to Nestlé Milky Bar KidRudd the Dudd Julia Gillard 
Full name: Julia Eileen GillardJu-liar part of a campaign of character assassination led by Alan Jones

 Tony Abbott 
Full name: Anthony John AbbottMad monk Malcolm Turnbull 
Full name: Malcolm Bligh TurnbullMr Harbourside MansionTurncoat Scott Morrison 
Full name: Scott John Morrison

 ScoMo Scummo as a further iteration of ScoMo.
 Liar from the ShireScotty from Marketing became a common nickname due to Morrison's perceived poor response to the 2019 Australian bushfires. It originated in an article on satirical web site The Betoota Advocate during the bushfires.Scotty From Marketing Holds Focus Group To Suss Out If He'll Get Booed At The Sydney Test, The Betoota Advocate The name is still used frequently, and refers to Morrison's previous roles as Managing Director of Tourism Australia from 2004 to 2006 and as the inaugural Director of the New Zealand Office of Tourism and Sport from 1998 to 2000.

Anthony AlbaneseFull name: Anthony Norman Albanese

 Albo Airbus Albo''', due to his perceived propensity for overseas junketing.

References

Australia